Ole B. Nelson (August 25, 1850 – June 6, 1922) was a Danish-American politician in the state of Washington. He served in the Washington House of Representatives from 1893 to 1897.

References

1850 births
1922 deaths
Republican Party members of the Washington House of Representatives
Danish emigrants to the United States
Place of birth missing